Ocate or OCATE may refer to:

 Ocate, New Mexico, United States, an unincorporated community
 Ocate Peak, New Mexico
 Ocate volcanic field, New Mexico
 Oregon Center for Advanced Technology Education